Rexhep Rexhepi is a multi-purpose stadium in Glogovac, Kosovo. The ground serves as the home ground of KF Feronikeli.

History

The stadium is named after the club's former player and captain Rexhep Rexhepi, who fought for the Kosovo Liberation Army and was killed on 12 February 1999 by Serb forces.

Renovation
In December 2012 work began on the ground in order to renovate the single stand, the playing field as well as the clubhouse, with funding coming from the Ministry of Culture, Youth and Sports. In January 2014 the local municipality  began to seek investment form the central government and the Ministry of Culture, Youth and Sports to complete a full renovation of the stadium in order to convert into a 2,000 all seater stadium, and this was granted on 23 May 2014, when the Ministry of Culture, Youth and Sports along with the Gllogoc municipality signed the agreement to invest €100,000 into a three-stage renovation process. The entire project cost a total of €200,000, and stage two was completed during the 2014–15 season, while the third stage was completed after the end of the season in the summer of 2015.

As FC Prishtina stadium

Rexhep Rexhepi Stadium was the FC Prishtina stadium during the 2017–18 season, while their stadium was under renovation.

Notes and references

Notes

References

Football venues in Kosovo